Tamim is an Arabic name that may refer to

Given name
Tamim al-Ansari, Muslim saint
Tamim al-Barghouti, Palestinian poet, columnist and political scientist
Tamim al-Dari (died 661), companion of the Islamic prophet Muhammad
Tamim bin Hamad Al Thani (born 1980), Emir of Qatar
Tamim ibn al-Mu'izz (died 1108), ruler of the Zirids in Ifriqiya
Tamim Ansary (born 1948), Afghan-American author and public speaker
Tamim Bashir (died 2004), Bangladeshi cricketer
Tamim Chowdhury (1986–2016), Bangladeshi-Canadian Islamist 
Tamim Iqbal (born 1989), Bangladeshi cricketer

Surname
Dhahi Khalfan Tamim (born 1951), Head of General Security for the Emirate of Dubai and former Police Commissioner
Dunash ibn Tamim, 10th century Jewish scholar
Mohammad Tamim Nuristani, businessman and politician from Afghanistan
Mohamad Siraj Tamim (born 1985), Lebanese sprinter
Mohammed Tamim, Moroccan architect, economist, and francophone writer
Suzanne Tamim (1977–2008), Lebanese singer murdered in Dubai

See also
Tamimi (surname)

Arabic-language surnames